Cornwall is an unincorporated community in Latah County, in the U.S. state of Idaho.

History
Cornwall was founded in 1887 by Mason Cornwall, and named for him. A post office was established at Cornwall in 1887, and remained in operation until it was discontinued in 1901.

The founder's home, the Mason Cornwall House, is listed on the National Register of Historic Places.

Cornwall's population was 50 in 1909.

References

Unincorporated communities in Latah County, Idaho
Populated places established in 1887
1887 establishments in Idaho Territory